"Well, Did You Evah!" is a song written by Cole Porter for his 1939 musical DuBarry Was a Lady, where it was introduced by Betty Grable and Charles Walters. It is written as a duet, with the pair exchanging bad news and each shrugging off the other's tidbits in favor of an aloof good time.

Notable uses
Originally appears in Broadway musical DuBarry Was a Lady (1939).
Bing Crosby and Frank Sinatra in the movie High Society (recorded January 17, 1956). Likely the most well-known version of the song, it was added to the movie late in development, to give the two stars an opportunity to sing together.
Deborah Harry and Iggy Pop recorded the song in 1990 for Red Hot + Blue, a compilation album released as part of a HIV/AIDS benefit project. Released as a single in the UK on December 24, 1990 but not the US. The single reached No. 42 in the UK Singles Chart, and No. 29 in the Irish chart.
Revivals of DuBarry or its score were produced in New York, London and San Francisco in 1993, 1996, 2001, and 2014. The 2001 production was recorded by the BBC for broadcast in 2002. All included Well, Did You Evah! using the original lyrics.
A cover of the song was performed by British singer Robbie Williams on collaboration with American actor Jon Lovitz.
The song was parodied for use in Iceland‘s Christmas adverts in 2009, sung by Coleen Nolan and Jason Donovan.
 The song was sung in Week 5 of Over the Rainbow (2010 TV series) by the competing Dorothies, as part of a mash-up with Wild Thing by The Troggs and Get The Party Started by P!nk.
 Marks & Spencer used it in their 2004 Christmas advert on what makes the perfect Christmas cocktail, starring Rachel Stevens, Martine McCutcheon, Gordon Ramsay and Helen Mirren.
Kevin Kline and Ashley Judd sang it in the 2004 Cole Porter biopic, De-Lovely

References

1939 songs
1991 singles
Songs written by Cole Porter
Songs from Cole Porter musicals
Songs from High Society (1956 film)
Bing Crosby songs
Frank Sinatra songs
Debbie Harry songs
Robbie Williams songs
Male–female vocal duets
Iggy Pop songs